Scilla is a genus of perennial herbs. Scilla may also refer to
Scilla (name)
Scilla, Calabria, a town in Italy
Scilla Lighthouse in Italy
Dorsum Scilla, a wrinkle ridge on the Moon
Scylla, a monster in Greek mythology
A short form of Priscilla, a female given name
Scilla, a smart contract programming language for Zilliqa

See also
Scylla (disambiguation)
Silla (name)
Sillah
Sylla